The term Tactica or Taktika can refer to:

Two Byzantine military treatises on tactics and strategy:

 the Tactica of Emperor Leo VI the Wise, written in the early 10th century and attributed to the emperor Leo VI the Wise
 the Tactica of Nikephoros Ouranos, written in the early 11th century by Nikephoros Ouranos, a Byzantine general

The treatises on administrative structure, court protocol and precedence written in the Byzantine Empire, collectively called "Taktika". These were:

 the Taktikon Uspensky, written c. 842
 the Kletorologion of Philotheos, written in 899
 the Taktikon Benešević, written in 934–944
 the Escorial Taktikon or Taktikon Oikonomides after its first editor, written c. 971–975
 the "Book of Offices" (Taktikon) of pseudo-Kodinos, written in the mid-14th century

Firearms
 Saiga Taktika, a Russian combat shotgun

Vehicle
 Alvis Tactica, British produced military vehicle